Elaphidion iviei is a species of beetle in the family Cerambycidae. It was described by Lingafelter in 2008.

References

iviei
Beetles described in 2008